Jorge Marín (born September 22, 1963) is a Mexican sculptor and painter. He has been an active figure in the contemporary art world for the last 25 years. He began to sculpt ceramic in the early 1980s. Bronze has been his preferred material for the last ten years. His work often depicts horses, centaurs, garudas, children, madonnas, acrobats, along with elements such as spheres, masks, wings, arrows, boats and scales. These concepts are consistent with recurring themes such as reflection and balance.

Biography
Marín was born in Uruapan, Michoacán, Mexico. The youngest of a family of ten brothers and sisters (which includes Javier Marín, colleague and brother), Jorge Marín inherited his passion for the fine arts from his father, a well-known architect. He left Uruapan, Michoacán to live in Mexico City when he was seven years old. Marín recalls his early years in the town of Uruapan as something like living in “Macondo,” the mystical town in the Gabriel García Márquez novel One Hundred Years of Solitude.

Academic background
1980 Graphic Design, ENAP-UNAM, Mexico City.
1982 Fine Arts Restoration, Escuela Nacional de Conservación, Restauración y Museografía “Manuel Castillo Negrete” INAH-SEP, Mexico City.

Art work

His work focuses mainly on the human figure as a metaphor of its own experiences. His style has a strong foundation in the integration of baroque dramatic art with a powerful sensuality and a subtle sense of the perverse. Uncomplicated and easy to read, his work is accessible to wide audiences.

Jorge Marin´s work in sculpture is a compendium of the vital impulses of the human being and his body, which Marin interprets as the landscape of man’s own existence.

El Ángel de la Seguridad Social is installed along Mexico City's Paseo de la Reforma. El Vigilante is installed in Ecatepec de Morelos.

Other facts
In 2006, Jorge Marin’s sculptures served as the inspiration for a dance and acrobatics production munDOSmarinOS, performed by the contemporary dance company Humanicorp.
Since September 7, 2010, one of the most representative exhibitions of the work of the sculptor is located in Paseo de la Reforma, on the ridge opposite the Museum of Anthropology, entitled "The Wings of the City." It consists of 13 monumental works in bronze. This collection of sculptures is exhibited for the first time in a public forum.

See also 
 Art of Mexico
 Contemporary Art
 Sculpture
 Mask

References

External links 

 Jorge Marín Homepage.
 Jorge Marín on Facebook.
 Jorge Marín on ArtNet
 Jorge Marín at the Gallery ArTiane, Honfleur, France

1963 births
Living people
Mexican sculptors
Male sculptors
Mexican painters
Artists from Michoacán
People from Uruapan
Mexican contemporary artists